The following table contains a list of Dutch exonyms for places located in Germany.  The places can be sorted alphabetically by either their Dutch or English name by clicking on the arrows (▲▼) at the top of the respective columns..

See also

Dutch exonyms
List of European exonyms

Dutch language lists
Dutch
Dutch exonyms in Germany
Dutch

de:Liste niederländischer Exonyme für deutsche Toponyme